Events from the year 1878 in Sweden

Incumbents
 Monarch – Oscar II
 Prime Minister – Louis Gerhard De Geer

Events

 21 July - The Vega Expedition starts
 August – Mission Covenant Church of Sweden is founded
 22 November  - The Metric system is introduced in Sweden
 6 December - The Phonograph is introduced in Sweden
 - First issue of Bohusläningen
 - The Stockholm University is founded. 
 - The Eldkvarn fire.
 - The Svenska Federationen is founded to stop the regulation of prostitutes. It also questioned the sexual double standards that justified it, which also inspired the public sexual morality debate referred to as Sedlighetsdebatten.
 - The Swedish colony of Saint Barthélemy is bought by the French.

Births

 4 January – Rosa Grünberg, actress and singer   (died 1960)
 25 January – Ernst Alexanderson, television pioneer (died 1975)
 27 May – Anna Cervin, artist (died 1972)

Deaths

 8 February – Elias Magnus Fries, mycologist and botanist  (born 1794) 
 October 8 - Caroline Ridderstolpe, composer  (born 1793) 
 30 November – Dorothea Dunckel, playwright  (born 1799)

References

 
Years of the 19th century in Sweden
Sweden